George Edward Negus AM (born 13 March 1942) is an Australian journalist, author, television and radio presenter specialising in international affairs. He was a pioneer of Australian TV journalism, first appearing on the ABC’s groundbreaking This Day Tonight and later on Sixty Minutes. Negus was known for making complex international and political issues accessible to a broad audience through his down-to-earth, colloquial presentation style. His very direct interviewing technique occasionally caused confrontation, famously with Margaret Thatcher, but also led to some interviewees giving more information than they had given in other interviews. Recognition of his unique skills led to him hosting the ABC’s new show, Foreign Correspondent and Dateline on SBS. He often reported from the frontline of dangerous conflicts and described himself as an “anti-war correspondent” who wanted people to understand the reasons behind why wars were senseless. He was awarded a Walkley Award for Outstanding Contribution to Journalism.  He presented 6.30 with George Negus on Network Ten. He remains a director of his own media consulting company, Negus Media International.

Education
Negus attended Inala  State High School and Indooroopilly State High School located in the Brisbane suburb of Indooroopilly in Queensland. He studied arts and journalism at the University of Queensland.

Career
Negus was a high school teacher before writing for The Australian and The Australian Financial Review. He served as press secretary for Attorney-General Lionel Murphy during the Whitlam government. During his time as a political staffer he was most famous for having leaked to the press the imminent investigation of ASIO's headquarters by Murphy. The event became known as the 1973 Murphy raids.

TV journalism
Negus became most prominent as a reporter for This Day Tonight, a pioneering current affairs show on the ABC which began in 1967 and continued through the late 1960s and into the 1970s. Later, he was a founding correspondent for the Australian 60 Minutes program in from 1979 until 1986 and then co-hosted Today Australia until 1990.

From 1992 until 1999, Negus was founding host of the ABC's foreign-themed current affairs Foreign Correspondent. He then went to live in Italy for 15 months on a professional sabbatical but produced a book entitled "The World From Italy – Football, Food and Politics" which was published in 2001.

In 2002, Negus returned to the ABC to facilitate a pre-election panel and audience discussion program "Australia Talks" before commencing 3 years as host of the early evening timeslot George Negus Tonight covering "trends and issues with an Australia-wide team of reporters and producers". The show was cancelled in November 2004, due to changes in regional funding to the broadcaster.

In 2005, Negus went on to host Dateline on the SBS network. In this role he became known as one of Australia's most respected journalists. 

After becoming a regular on Ten's evening news program The 7PM Project, produced by Roving Enterprises he began hosting 6.30 with George Negus on Network Ten in 2011.

Ben Roberts-Smith incident
On the 28 February 2012 episode of The Circle, Negus along with Yumi Stynes, made comments about a photo of Corporal Ben Roberts-Smith, a Victoria Cross and Medal for Gallantry recipient, coming out of a swimming pool. After tabloid criticism, they personally contacted Roberts-Smith who accepted their apology and agreed there was no malicious intent. Negus said his comments were taken out of context and he was not referring personally to Corporal Roberts-Smith.

On 13 September 2014, Fairfax newspapers issued an apology to Stynes and Negus, stating "Our interpretation was wrong and we accept that both Mr Negus and Ms Stynes were not referring to Cpl Roberts-Smith personally."
News Limited publications, The Daily Telegraph, Herald Sun and news.com.au also retracted the incorrect allegations.

Books
Negus has written several books, including one based on his time in Italy, and co-wrote a six-part series of children's books with Kirsty Cockburn, his partner, in the early 1990s. His latest book is "The World from DownUnder – A Chat with Recent History" and published by Harper Collins Australia. His best selling The World from Islam, published in 2004, an investigation of the Islamic world as seen from Negus's travels in the Middle East. In The World from Islam, Negus defends Islam from claims of extremism, citing Islam's diversity.

Personal life
Negus lived in Bellingen before he was moved into a Sydney nursing home in late 2021 after being diagnosed with dementia. His children were raised on a farm near Bellingen on the New South Wales northern coast, where he lived for 15 years with his wife, Kirsty Cockburn, herself a journalist and a collaborator on many of Negus's projects. Negus' son, Serge Cockburn was the child actor who played Mikey Dundee alongside Paul Hogan in Crocodile Dundee in Los Angeles. Negus is a fan of association football and a former board member of the national governing body Soccer Australia, as it was known at the time.

Honours
Negus became a Member of the Order of Australia in the 2015 Australia Day honours.

References
 https://www.walkleys.com/award-winners/george-negus/

https://www.library.act.gov.au/__data/assets/pdf_file/0009/428328/gillespie.pdf

External links

 Official website
 George Negus's Professional Record – Speaker and Author
 Who Weekly interview

1942 births
60 Minutes (Australian TV program) correspondents
Australian male writers
Australian television presenters
Living people
Logie Award winners
Special Broadcasting Service
Members of the Order of Australia
Writers from Brisbane
Writers from Sydney
University of Queensland alumni